Samsung Galaxy Tab S can be:
 Samsung Galaxy Tab S 8.4 - 8.4 inch Samsung tablet
 Samsung Galaxy Tab S 10.5 - 10.5 inch Samsung tablet
 Samsung Galaxy Tab series - Samsung tablet series